Jeong Ha-dam (born February 28, 1994) is a South Korean actress. Jeong debuted with a lead role in Wild Flowers (2015). Her second lead role was in Steel Flower (2016), in which she was praised for her outstanding performance by Variety. She was awarded the Rising Star Awards to recognize new actors and actresses who have contributed to the film industry at the 2016 Max Movie Awards.

Filmography

Film

Television Show

As script editor

Awards and nominations

References

External links 
 Jeong Ha-dam at Finecut Entertainment 
 
 

1994 births
Living people
People from Seoul
Actresses from Seoul
21st-century South Korean actresses
South Korean film actresses
South Korean television actresses